Night Birds, released in 1982 on the Polydor label, is the second album by English jazz-funk band Shakatak. Night Birds established Shakatak's trademark jazz-funk sound, and contains two of the band's biggest hits, "Easier Said than Done" and "Night Birds", the former reaching the No. 12 spot in 1981, the latter climbing to No. 9 in the following year.

Track listing
 All tracks written by William "Bill" Sharpe and Roger Odell except where indicated.

Side 1:
"Night Birds" – 6:25
"Streetwalkin'" – 5:30
"Rio Nights" – 5:18
"Fly the Wind" – 4:20

Side 2:
"Easier Said Than Done" – 6:10
"Bitch to the Boys" – 6:28
"Light on My Life" – 4:48
"Takin' Off" (William "Bill" Sharpe) – 5:08

 Produced by Nigel Wright.

Charts

Personnel
 Bill Sharpe – Bösendorfer grand piano, Fender Rhodes electric piano; Oberheim OB-X synthesizer, ARP Odyssey and Prophet-10 synthesisers
 Nigel Wright – Fender Rhodes electric piano, Oberheim OB-X & Prophet-10 synthesisers, trombone, brass arrangements
 Keith Winter – Yamaha SG2000 & Gibson ES-345 electric guitars, Ovation acoustic guitar; Mesa Boogie amplification and Custom Pedal Board
 George Anderson – Music Man StingRay and G&L 2000E electric basses
 Roger Odell – Sonor drums, Avedis Zildjian cymbals
 Jill Saward – vocals
 Jackie Rawe – vocals (also lead vocal on "Streetwalkin'")

Additional personnel
 Vocals by Lorna Bannon; lead vocal on "Light on My Life"
 Percussion, Portuguese translation and vocal on "Rio Nights" by Simon Morton
 Trumpet by Stuart Brooks
 Saxophone solos on "Streetwalkin'" and "Light on My Life" by Dick Morrissey (courtesy of Beggars Banquet)

References

External links 
 Shakatak - Night Birds (1982) album review by Sharon Mawer, credits & releases at AllMusic
 Shakatak - Night Birds (1982) album releases & credits at Discogs
 Shakatak - Night Birds (1982) album to be listened as stream on Spotify

1982 albums
Shakatak albums
Polydor Records albums
Albums produced by Nigel Wright